Implied repo rate (IRR) is the rate of return of borrowing money to buy an asset in the spot market and delivering it in the futures market where the notional is used to repay the loan.

Simplified closed form 

where dayBase is 365 or 360

Usage

Determine the cheapest to deliver asset 
To determine the cheapest bond in a basket of deliverable bonds against a futures contract, implied repo rate is computed for each bond; the bond with the highest repo rate is the cheapest. It is the cheapest because it has the lowest initial value to yield a higher return provided it is delivered with the stated futures price.

The net basis between a futures price and its underlying bonds may provide an indication of which bond is the cheapest. However, since the method, unlike the IRR method, neglects the actual running cost of bonds, it is less accurate as a measure for CTD ranking.

See also

Official bank rate
Repo rate
Repurchase agreement

References 
 Futures Bond Basis

Financial markets
Mathematical finance